Vukoslavić was a Serbian noble family that held a region in Pomoravlje during the Serbian Empire (1331–1379) and its fall (1379–1459).

History
The history starts with župan (Duke) Vukoslav, who held Trebinje, Gacko and Rudine in the western lands of King Stefan Dečanski, but loses them in 1328–1331. He was given an oblast that connected Pomoravlje (Ćuprija and Paraćin) with the lower part of the Timok Valley over Čestobrodice, by Emperor Dušan the Mighty (r. 1331-1355).

Vukoslav had two sons, Crep and Držman. Crep was a vassal to Prince Lazar of Serbia, and held the frontier region around Petrus Fortress, in Paraćin. Crep, together with his neighbour noble Vitomir, defeated an Ottoman army at the Battle of Dubravnica on the Dubravnica River near Paraćin on the 25th of December, 1380/1381.

Crep founded Sisojevac monastery, he also contributed to the Great Lavra (Athos).

The family was involved in a brief conflict about a church and its villages (Lešje) that Vukoslav had given to Chilandar in 1360. The two brothers had asked for the return of these, and Lazar had supported them (mentioned in the chrysobulls of Lazar). It was settled in 1411, when Despot Stefan Lazarević gave Hilandar other donations, returning Vukoslavs' donations to Venedikt, the son of Crep.

Members
Vukoslav, Duke of towns in Herzegovina, later Pomoravlje
Crep, voivode
Venedikt Crepović, Lord and monk (kyr)
Anisija, Orthodox nun, died 1426/1427
Držman (Dionisije, monastic name)

References

Sources
Primary:
 Jašović Predrag, Petković Đorđe, Petruška vlastela i kosovskometohijski duhovni prostor, 2007. 
Other:
 Balcanoslavica, Volumes 6-9, 1978. Google Books
 Marko Šuica, „Nemirno doba srpskog srednjeg veka“, Beograd, 2000. 

Serbian noble families
14th-century Serbian nobility
Serbian Empire
Pomoravlje District